= Greencells Group =

Solar energy company

- Type: GmbH
- Industry: Renewable energy, photovoltaics, Solar energy
- Founded: 2009
- Headquarters: Saarbrücken, Germany,
- Key people: Fabian Herr
- Revenue: 209.7 M euro (2023)
- Number of employees: 300
- Website: greencells.com

Greencells Group, based in Saarbrücken, is an internationally active provider of EPC and O&M services for large-scale photovoltaic systems. With a total installed capacity of over 3 GWp, Greencells is the leading EPC service provider in Europe.

== Company ==
=== History ===
Greencells was founded in Saarbrücken in 2009 and initially specialized in the installation of large-scale photovoltaic systems. In the years that followed, the company developed into an internationally active provider of turnkey EPC (engineering, procurement, and construction) and O&M (operations and maintenance) services for large-scale photovoltaic systems. In 2018, the value chain was expanded to include project development. At the end of 2024, the project development division was successfully sold to a consortium of Davidson Kempner and Nature Infrastructure Capital.

Since 2018, the Zahid Group, one of Forbes ME's Top 100 Family Businesses, has been a strategic investor in the Greencells Group.

=== Services ===
Greencells offers turnkey services in engineering, procurement, and construction (EPC) as well as operation and maintenance (O&M) for solar power plants. The company implements large-scale photovoltaic projects worldwide and supports customers throughout the entire project lifecycle. Construction quality is ensured by, among other things, in-house installation teams at the regional hub in Romania.

=== Locations ===
- Saarbrücken (HQ)
- Greencells CEE S.R.L., Cluj-Napoca, Romania

== Awards ==
- Best Issuer SME Green Bonds 2020
